The Alagón is a 205 km long river in Spain, right tributary to the Tagus, as well as this river's longest tributary.  Its source is at 1060 m in the Sierra de Francia, near the village Frades de la Sierra, south of Salamanca. The Alagón flows southwest, through the towns San Esteban de la Sierra, Guijo de Granadilla and Coria. It finally joins the Tagus at Alcántara.

There are three dams across its course: the "Gabriel y Galán", the largest one, generating 110 MW of electricity; the "El Pontón", at Guijo de Granadilla, generating 52 MW of electricity; and the "Montehermoso-Valdeobispo" dam.

Tributaries
Francia River, Sangusín River, Cuerpo de Hombre River, La Palla River, Río de los Ángeles, Ambroz River, Jerte River and Árrago River.

See also 
 List of rivers of Spain

External links

 Images of the Alagón River at the beginning of its course

Rivers of Spain
Tributaries of the Tagus
Rivers of Castile and León
Rivers of Extremadura